The Hunterian Oration is a lecture of the Royal College of Surgeons of England, named in honour of pioneering surgeon John Hunter and held on his birthday, 14 February, each year.

History
The oration was founded in 1813 by the executors of the will of surgeon John Hunter, his nephew Dr Matthew Baillie, and his brother-in-law Sir Everard Home, who made a gift to the Royal College of Surgeons of England to provide an annual oration and a dinner for Members of the Court of Assistants and others. 

In 1853, the oration and dinner became biennial; it is held on alternate years in rotation with the Bradshaw Lecture. Delivered by a Fellow or Member of the college on 14 February, Hunter's birthday, "such oration to be expressive of the merits in comparative anatomy, physiology, and surgery, not only of John Hunter, but also of all persons, as should be from time to time deceased, whose labours have contributed to the improvement or extension of surgical science".

The RCS Oration is not to be confused with the Hunterian Society Oration given at the Hunterian Society.

Orators

19th century 
1813 Sir William Blizard
1814 Everard Home
1815 John Percival Pott
1816 Henry Cline
1817 William Norris
1818 Sir David Dundas, 1st Baronet
1819 John Abernethy
1820 Sir Anthony Carlisle
1821 Thomas Chevalier
1822 Everard Home In Honour of Surgery
1823 Sir William Blizard
1824 Henry Cline
1825 William Norris
1826 Sir Anthony Carlisle on Oysters
1827 Honoratus Leigh Thomas
1828 Sir William Blizard
1829 John Painter Vincent, Observations on Some Parts of Surgical Practice 
1830 George James Guthrie
1831 Anthony White
1832 Samuel Cooper
1833 John Howship
1834 Sir William Lawrence
1835
1837 Sir Benjamin Collins Brodie
1838 Benjamin Travers
1839 Edward Stanley 
1840 Joseph Henry Green, Vital Dynamics 
1841 Richard Dugard Grainger
1842 George Gisborne Babington
1843 James Moncrieff Arnott
1844 John Flint South on the History of Medicine
1845 Jordan Roche Lynch
1846 Sir William Lawrence
1847 Joseph Henry Green, Mental Dynamics, or Groundwork of a professional education
1848 Richard Dugard Grainger, The Cultivation of Organic Science
1849 Caesar Hawkins
1850 Frederic Carpenter Skey
1851 Richard Anthony Stafford (not delivered due to illness)
1852 James Luke
1853 Bransby Blake Cooper
1855 Joseph Hodgson
1857 Thomas Wormald
1859 John Bishop
1861 William Coulson
1863 George Gulliver on William Hewson and John Quekett as discoverers.
1865 Richard Partridge
1867 John Hilton
1869 Richard Quain, On some Defects in General Education 
1871 Sir William Fergusson
1873 Henry Hancock
1875 Frederick Le Gros Clark
1877 Sir James Paget, Science in Surgery
1879 Sir George Murray Humphry
1881 Luther Holden
1883 Thomas Spencer Wells
1885 John Marshall
1887 William Scovell Savory, Surgery in its Relation to Science 
1889 Henry Power
1891 Sir Jonathan Hutchinson
1893 Thomas Bryant, 100th Anniversary of John Hunter's Death  
1895 John Whitaker Hulke. John Hunter, The Biologist 
1897 Christopher Heath, John Hunter Considered as a Great Surgeon
1899 Sir William MacCormac

20th century 
1901 Nottidge Charles MacNamara, The Human Skull in Relation to Brain Growth 
1903 Sir Henry Howse
1905 Sir John Tweedy
1907 Sir Henry T. Butlin, Objects of Hunter's Life and the Manner in which he Accomplished them 
1909 Sir Henry Morris, John Hunter as a Philosopher 
1911 Edmund Owen, John Hunter and his Museum 
1913 Sir Rickman Godlee, On Hunter and Lister, and on the Museum of the Royal College of Surgeons of England 
1915 Sir William Watson Cheyne, The Treatment of Wounds in War 
1917 Sir George Henry Makins, The Influence Exerted by the Military Experience of John Hunter on himself and the Military Surgeon of Today 
1919 Sir Anthony Bowlby, British Military Surgery in the time of Hunter and in the Great War 
1921 Sir Charters J. Symonds, On Astley Cooper and Hunterian Principles 
1923 Sir John Bland-Sutton, John Hunter, his affairs, habits and opinions  
1925 D'Arcy Power, John Hunter as a Man
1927 Berkeley Moynihan, Hunter’s ideals and Lister’s practice 
1928 Sir Holburt Waring, The Progress of Surgery from Hunter's day to ours 
1929 A. W. Sheen, Some Aspects of the Surgery of the Spleen 
1930 Ernest W. Hey Groves, Hero Worship in Surgery 
1932 Wilfred Trotter, The Commemoration of Great Men 
1934 Cuthert Sidney Wallace, Medical Education, 1760-1934 
1936 Charles Herbert Fagge, John Hunter to John Hilton 
1938 Eric Riches
1939 Sampson Handley, Makers of John Hunter 
1941 Arthur Henry Burgess, Development of Provincial Medical Education Illustrated in the Life and Work of Charles White of Manchester 
1942 Eric Riches
1943 William Francis Victor Bonney, The Forces behind Specialism in Surgery 
1945 George Grey Turner, The Hunterian Museum, yesterday and to-morrow
1949 Henry S. Souttar, John Hunter the Observer 
1951 Sir Max Page, The Hunterian Heritage 
1953 Lionel E. C. Norbury, The Hunterian Era: Its Influence on the Art and Science of Surgery 
1956 Sir Henry Cohen, Reflections on the Hunterian Method 
1957 Ernest Finch, The influence of the Hunters on medical education
1959 Sir Reginald Watson-Jones, Surgery is Destined to the Practice of Medicine
1961 Russell Brock, Baron Brock on the Museum, Research and Inspiration of Hunter 
1963 Sir Stanford Cade, The Lasting Dynamism of John Hunter 
1965 A. Dickson Wright, John Hunter's Private Practice
1967 Arthur Porritt, Baron Porritt, John Hunter, Distant Echoes 
1969 Leslie Norman Pyrah, John Hunter and After
1971 Sir Hedley Atkins, The Attributes of Genius from Newton to Darwin 
1973 Sir Thomas Holmes Sellors, Some Pupils of John Hunter 
1975 Sir Rodney Smith, The Hunters and the Arts
1977 Richard Harrington Franklin, John Hunter and his relevance in 1977 
1978 (250th anniversary): John Wolfenden, Baron Wolfenden, Hunter, Hippocrates and Humanity  
1979 George Qvist, Some controversial aspects of John Hunter's life and work. 
1981 Sir Reginald Sydney Murley, Peace and strife in Hunter's time 
1983 Not given due to death of speaker (Sir Alan Parks)
1984 Anthony John Harding Rains, The continuing message
1985 Donald Campbell
1986 Peter John Ryan, Two Kinds of Diverticular Disease
1987 Sir Geoffrey Slaney
1989 Sir Roy Calne
1991 John Blandy
1993 Sir Miles Horsfall Irving (born 1935, professor of surgery at the University of Manchester) 
1995 John Alexander-Williams
1997 H. Brendan Devlin
1999 Jack Hardcastle

21st century 
2001 Bill Heald
2003 Charles S. B. Galasko, Hunter's Legacy and Surgical Training and Competence in the 21st Century 
2005 Sir Peter Morris
2007 Anthony Mundy
2009 Linda de Cossart
2010 Simon Chaplin
2011 Norman Stanley Williams
2013 Sir Bruce E. Keogh
2015 Martin Elliott

References 

Annual events in the United Kingdom
British lecture series
Medical lecture series
Recurring events established in 1813
Royal College of Surgeons of England